is a Japanese footballer currently playing as a midfielder for Iwate Grulla Morioka.

Career statistics

Club
.

Notes

References

External links

1994 births
Living people
Japanese footballers
Association football midfielders
Komazawa University alumni
Montenegrin First League players
J3 League players
Sanfrecce Hiroshima players
OFK Titograd players
FK Kom players
Iwate Grulla Morioka players